Siegfried Berisch (? – 4 October 1933, in Vienna), was a German-Jewish actor.

Partial filmography 
 1922: 
 1923: The Tiger of Circus Farini
 1925: Countess Maritza
 1926: The Queen of the Baths 
 1926: The Three Mannequins
 1926: The Queen of the Baths
 1927: The Salvation Army Girl
 1927: The False Prince
 1929: The Veil Dancer
 1930: Mischievous Miss
 1929: The Veil Dancer
 1929: Yes, Yes, Women Are My Weakness
 1929: A Mother's Love
 1930: Darling of the Gods
 1930: The Man in the Dark
 1930: Next, Please!
 1930: Retreat on the Rhine
 1931: The Office Manager
 1931: Without Meyer, No Celebration is Complete
 1931: Berlin-Alexanderplatz
 1932: No Money Needed

References

External links 
 
 Siegfried Berisch on Filmportal.de
 Siegfried Berisch on Ciné-Ressources

Year of birth missing
1933 deaths
20th-century German Jews
Jewish German male actors
German male film actors
German male silent film actors
20th-century German male actors